Duchess Mary is the name of:

Mary Stewart, Duchess of Richmond (1622–1685), English duchess
Mary Howard, Duchess of Norfolk (died 1705) (c. 1659–1705), British peeress
Mary Howard, Duchess of Norfolk (died 1773) (c. 1712–1773), British peeress
Mary Osborne, Duchess of Leeds (1723–1764), British duchess
Princess Mary, Duchess of Gloucester and Edinburgh (1776–1857), member of the British Royal Family
Mary Russell, Duchess of Bedford (1865–1937), English pilot and ornithologist
Mary Cavendish, Duchess of Devonshire (1895–1988), Chancellor of the University of Exeter
Mary Somerset, Duchess of Beaufort (sportswoman) (1897–1987), Commander of the Order of St John
Mary Montagu Douglas Scott, Duchess of Buccleuch (1900–1993), British duchess
Mary Innes-Ker, Duchess of Roxburghe (1915–2014), British duchess

See also
Duchess Maria (disambiguation)
Duchess Marie (disambiguation)